Kanstantsin Siamionau (born 22 October 1978) is a Belarusian judoka.

Achievements

External links
 
 

1978 births
Living people
Belarusian male judoka
Universiade medalists in judo
Universiade bronze medalists for Belarus